Vira Bahu I (1196) was son of Nissanka Malla and king of the Kingdom of Polonnaruwa, in present-day Sri Lanka. He came to the throne after his father's death, however only managed to reign for less than a day, being crowned at night and slain at dawn by the commander-in-chief of the army, Tavuru Senevirat on the grounds that he was a son not equal to his father.

See also
 Mahavamsa
 List of monarchs of Sri Lanka
 History of Sri Lanka

References

External links
 Kings & Rulers of Sri Lanka
 Codrington's Short History of Ceylon

Monarchs of Polonnaruwa
1196 deaths
Year of birth unknown
V
V
V
Assassinated heads of state
12th-century murdered monarchs